The western three-striped skink (Trachylepis occidentalis) is a species of skink found in Namibia, South Africa, Botswana, and Angola.

References

Trachylepis
Reptiles described in 1867
Taxa named by Wilhelm Peters